Dominican law theorists make a fundamental distinction between primary sources of law, which can give rise to binding legal norms, and secondary sources, sometimes called authorities. The primary sources are enacted law and custom, with the former overwhelmingly more important. Sometimes, “general principles of law” are also considered a primary source. Authorities may have weight when primary sources are absent, unclear, or incomplete, but they are never binding, and they are neither necessary nor sufficient as the basis for a judicial decision. Case law and the writings of legal scholars are as such secondary sources.

Primary sources of law included enacted law, custom, and general principles. Enacted law includes legal rules adopted by the legislature, the executive and administrative agencies. The various types of enacted law form a hierarchy with the constitution at the pinnacle, followed by legislation, then by executive decrees, then by administrative regulations, and finally by local ordinances. Account must also be taken of the increasing importance of international treaties and conventions. Parliamentary legislation, including the Civil and Commercial codes, is today the principal source of law in the Dominican Republic.

While custom is technically considered a primary source of law, in practice custom is more often than not routinely dismissed as of slight importance. Custom (in the form of trade usage) plays a greater role in commercial law than it does in civil law generally.

It is sometimes said that “general principles”, derived either from norms of positive law or from the existence of the legal order itself, are a primary source of law. They are characterized as such by some French and Dominican scholars in discussions of the judicial doctrine of abuse of rights and the expansion of the notion of unjust enrichment.

Authorities, or secondary sources of law, include case law (jurisprudencia) and doctrine. While case law plays an enormous role in the everyday operation of the Dominican law system, because of the necessity to interpret and apply the “written” law, its legal use is mainly limited to deciding particular cases. Judicial pronouncements are not binding on lower courts in subsequent cases, nor are they binding on the same or coordinate courts. As a practical matter, however, it is generally recognized in the Dominican law system that judges do and should take into consideration prior decisions, especially when the settled case law shows that a line of cases has developed. Dominican judicial decisions have de facto weight in order to provide reasonable certainty and predictability; to meet the elementary demand of fairness that like cases be treated alike; and the related, but distinct, consideration that justice should not only be done, but should appear to have been done. Dominican courts commonly accept French case law as a source of law whenever the legal texts of the Dominican Republic and France are the same.

The writings of legal scholars (doctrina), like the court decisions, are considered authorities in the Dominican law system. The role of doctrine is, however, quite different from that of the case law. While case law authority operates to settle the law and to assure a degree of consistency within a judicial hierarchy, scholarly writing exerts its greatest direct influence when the law is unsettled or when there is no established law on a point. Thus, the doctrine indirectly controls, to a great extent, the judges’ understanding of the case law. The weight attached by judges to doctrinal writing varies according to a number of circumstances, including the reputation of the author and whether the view expressed is an isolated one or represents the consensus of the most respected writers. In general, it can be said that Dominican judges pay close attention to scholarly opinions (from Dominican as well as French sources), as expressed in general and specialized treatises, commentaries on the codes, monographs, law review articles and case notes, and expert opinions rendered in connection with litigation. Persistent doctrinal criticisms will often prompt re-examination of a holding, and will sometimes even lead to the abandonment of an established judicial position.

Dominican commercial law 

Dominican law has given a commercial nature to all acts, operations or activities carried out by business organizations. Therefore, in considering the applicable law in the generality of cases involving corporations in the Dominican Republic first priority is given the basic principles contained in the Dominican Commercial Code enacted on the July 4, 1882.

Dominican Commercial Law, whose direct and main source is the Commercial Code, has as subsidiary sources, the Civil Code and the trade customs. Many consider that Article 18 of the Dominican Commercial Code is the text that legitimates the Civil Law as an important source of the Commercial Law. However, there are important stipulations of the Civil Code that evidence the interdependence of both texts, as for example Article 1107 of the Civil Code comes to show .

See also
Legal systems of the world

References

External links
 "The World Factbook — Central Intelligence Agency"